Decades Rock Live: Bonnie Raitt and Friends is a DVD/CD combo, recorded live on September 30, 2005, at Trump Taj Majal, Atlantic City, New Jersey. Joining Bonnie Raitt on stage are Norah Jones, Ben Harper, Alison Krauss, Keb' Mo' and Jon Cleary. All of the songs on the CD are repeated on the DVD plus five that are exclusive to the DVD.

Reception

Track listing

Personnel
Bonnie Raitt: Vocals, Slide & Acoustic Guitar
James "Hutch" Hutchinson: Bass & Vocals
Ricky Fataar: Drums & Vocals
George Marinelli: Guitar & Vocals
Jon Cleary: Keyboards, Percussion & Vocals
Norah Jones: Vocals & Wurlitzer Electric Piano on tracks 11 & 12
Ben Harper: Vocals & Lap Slide Guitar on tracks 8, 9 & 12)
Alison Krauss: Vocals & Fiddle on tracks 6 & 12
Keb' Mo': Vocals & Electric Guitar on tracks 7 & 12

Production
Project Producer: Kathy Kane
Executive Producer: Barry Summers, Bonnie Raitt & Eric Sherman
Supervising Producer: Barry Ehrmann
Associate Producers: Annie Heller-Gutwillig & Rick Camino
Mastered by Jeff King
Mixed by Peter A. Barker
Video Editor: Marc Schrobilgen
Assistant Editors: Hannah Mayberry & Carmen Del Toro

Credits for musicians are for the CD. All track information and credits were taken from the DVD/CD liner notes.

References

External links
Bonnie Raitt Official Site
Capitol Records Official Site
Decades Rock Live Official Site

2006 live albums
2006 video albums
Bonnie Raitt live albums
Capitol Records live albums
Capitol Records video albums
Live video albums